From the Plantation to the Penitentiary is an album by jazz trumpeter Wynton Marsalis that was released in 2007. It reached No. 2 on Billboard 's Top Jazz chart.

Track listing

Personnel
 Wynton Marsalis – trumpet
 Walter Blanding – tenor and soprano saxophone
 Dan Nimmer – piano
 Carlos Henriquez – bass
 Ali Jackson – drums
 Jennifer Sanon – vocals

Charts
2007 Billboard Top Jazz Albums # 2

Further reading
Review of the album, including parts of an interview with Wynton Marsalis: Onesto, Li. "Wynton Marsalis: From the Plantation to the Penitentiary" Revolution March 18, 2007

References

External links
From the Plantation to the Penitentiary on Wynton Marsalis' official Web site

2007 albums
Wynton Marsalis albums
Blue Note Records albums
Post-bop albums